A Lost Letter (Romanian: O scrisoare pierdută) is a 1953 Romanian historical comedy film directed by Sica Alexandrescu and Victor Iliu. It is based on the 1884 play A Lost Letter by Ion Luca Caragiale.

Plot
A compromising love letter that goes astray threatens to cause a scandal in a small provincial town in the late nineteenth century.

Cast
 Marcel Anghelescu as Ghita Pristanda  
 Nicky Atanasiu as Stefan Tipatescu  
 Radu Beligan as Agamemnon Dandanache  
 Ion Finteșteanu as Tache Farfuridi  
 Alexandru Giugaru as Zaharia Trahanache  
 Elvira Godeanu as Zoe Trahanache  
 Ion Henter as Ionescu  
 Ion Talianu as Nae Catavencu 
 Grigore Vasiliu-Birlic as Branzovenescu

References

Bibliography 
 Thomas J. Slater. Handbook of Soviet and East European films and filmmakers. Greenwood Press, 1992.

External links 
 

1953 films
1950s historical comedy films
Romanian historical comedy films
1950s Romanian-language films
Films set in the 1890s
Romanian films based on plays
Films directed by Victor Iliu
Films set in Romania
Romanian black-and-white films